The Citrus Bowl  is an annual college football bowl game played at Camping World Stadium in Orlando, Florida. The bowl is operated by Florida Citrus Sports, a non-profit group that also organizes the Cheez-It Bowl and Florida Classic.

The game was first played as the Tangerine Bowl in 1947 before being renamed as the Florida Citrus Bowl in 1983. When Capital One was the game's title sponsor between 2001 and 2014, the game was referred to as the  Capital One Bowl from 2003 to 2014. Other previous sponsors include CompUSA (1994–1999), Ourhouse.com (2000), Buffalo Wild Wings (2015–2017), Overton's (2018), and  Vrbo (2019–2022).  On November 15, 2022, Kellogg's signed on as title sponsor of the game, placing its Cheez-It brand of snack crackers in the title position. Accordingly, the game is officially named the Cheez-It Citrus Bowl.

Since becoming one of the premier bowls, the Citrus Bowl is typically played at 1 p.m. EST on New Year's Day and broadcast nationally on ABC. When January 1 is a Sunday, the game has been played on January 2 or December 31, to avoid conflicting with the National Football League (NFL) schedule. , at $8.55 million per team, it has the largest payout of all bowls other than those that are part of the College Football Playoff (CFP). In nearly every year since 1985, the game has featured two teams ranked in the Top 25.

History
The game, which began play in 1947, is one of the oldest of the non-CFP bowls, along with the Gator Bowl and Sun Bowl. By 1952, the game was dubbed the "Little Bowl with the Big Heart", because all the proceeds from the game went to charity. 

Before 1968, the game featured matchups between schools throughout the South, often featuring the Ohio Valley Conference champion or other small colleges, although a few major colleges did play in the bowl during this early era as well.

From 1964 through 1967, it was one of the four regional finals in the College Division (which became Division II and Division III in 1973), along with the Pecan, Grantland Rice, and Camellia bowls.

In 1968, the Boardwalk Bowl in Atlantic City took over as a regional final, and the Tangerine Bowl became a major college bowl game, featuring teams from the University Division (which became Division I in 1973).

In March 1983, the name of the game was changed from Tangerine Bowl to Florida Citrus Bowl, via a $1.25 million agreement with the Florida Citrus Commission; the bowl's organizing committee also changed its name from Tangerine Sports Association to Florida Citrus Sports Association. A month earlier, organizers had rejected a proposal to rename the game to Grapefruit Bowl.

In 1986, it was one of the bowl games considered for the site of the "winner take all" national championship game between Penn State and Miami, before the Fiesta Bowl was eventually chosen.

The 1990 season game had national championship implications; Georgia Tech won the Florida Citrus Bowl, finished 11–0–1, and was voted the 1990 UPI national champion.

The 1997 season game, which featured nearby Florida beating Penn State, holds the game's attendance record at 72,940.

In 2004, the bowl bid to become the fifth BCS game, but was not chosen, primarily due to the stadium's aging condition. In July 2007, the Orange County Commissioners voted in favor of spending $1.1 billion to build the Amway Center for the Orlando Magic, the Dr. Phillips Center for the Performing Arts, and to upgrade the Citrus Bowl stadium.

Following the 2014 game, Capital One ceased its sponsorship of the bowl, and moved its sponsorship to the Orange Bowl. Buffalo Wild Wings was announced as the new title sponsor of the bowl game in 2014. Buffalo Wild Wings had previously been the title sponsor of what is now the Cactus Bowl. In the offseason of 2017, Buffalo Wild Wings ceased sponsoring the bowl as the search for a new sponsor is ongoing.

The 2016 season game was played on December 31, the first time in 30 years that the game was not played on January 1 or 2nd.

Conference tie-ins
From 1968 through 1975, the bowl featured the Mid-American Conference (MAC) champion against an opponent from the Southern Conference (1968–1971), the Southeastern Conference (SEC) (1973–1974), or an at-large opponent (1972, 1975). MAC teams were 6–2 during those games.

As the major football conferences relaxed restrictions on post-season play in the mid-1970s, the bowl went to a matchup between two at-large teams from major conferences, with one school typically (but not always) from the South.

From the 1987 season through the 1991 season, the bowl featured the Atlantic Coast Conference (ACC) champion against an at-large opponent. ACC teams were 3–2 during those games.

From the 1992 season through the 2015 season, the bowl featured an SEC vs. Big Ten matchup – the SEC won 14 of those games, while the Big Ten won 10.

During the 1990s, the second-place finisher in the SEC typically went to this bowl. Florida coach Steve Spurrier, speaking to the fact that Tennessee occupied that spot three of four years as Florida finished first, famously quipped "You can't spell 'Citrus' without U-T!"

Currently, the bowl has tie-ins with the SEC and the Big Ten, holding the first selection after the CFP selection process for both conferences. Since the formation of the CFP, the Citrus Bowl has a chance to occasionally host an ACC team, replacing the Big Ten representative. This will happen the years in which the Orange Bowl is not a CFP semi-final game and selects a Big Ten team to match against their ACC team. This happened following the 2016 season, as the Orange Bowl was not a CFP semi-final and invited Michigan of the Big Ten to face Florida State of the ACC; the Citrus Bowl then invited Louisville of the ACC to face LSU of the SEC.  The next year, Wisconsin was invited to the Orange Bowl, so the SEC's LSU was pitted against Notre Dame, who received an invite in lieu of an ACC team.

Racial integration
The undefeated 1955 Hillsdale College football team refused an invitation to the game when bowl officials insisted that Hillsdale's four African-American players would not be allowed to play in the game.

The University at Buffalo's first bowl bid was to the Tangerine Bowl in 1958. The Tangerine Bowl Commission hoped that the Orlando High School Athletic Association (OHSAA), which operated the stadium, would waive its rule that prohibited integrated sporting events. When it refused, the team unanimously voted to skip the bowl because its two black players (halfback Willie Evans and end Mike Wilson) would not have been allowed on the field. Buffalo would not be bowl-eligible for another 50 years. During the 2008 season, when the Bulls were on the verge of bowl eligibility, the 1958 team was profiled on ESPN's Outside the Lines. The 2008 team went on to win the Mid-American Conference title, and played in the International Bowl.

By 1966, the OHSAA's rule had been changed, and Morgan State of Baltimore, under head coach Earl Banks, became the first historically black college to play in (and win) the Tangerine Bowl.

Gainesville
In early 1973, construction improvements were planned for the then 17,000-seat Tangerine Bowl stadium to expand to over 51,000 seats. In early summer 1973, however, construction was stalled due to legal concerns, and the improvements were delayed. Late in the 1973 season, Tangerine Bowl President Will Gieger and other officials planned to invite the Miami Redskins and the East Carolina Pirates to Orlando for the game. On November 19, 1973, East Carolina withdrew its interests, and the bowl was left with one at-large bid. In an unexpected and unprecedented move, game officials decided to invite the Florida Gators, and move the game to Florida Field in Gainesville, the Gators' home stadium. The larger stadium would be needed to accommodate the large crowd expected. The move required special permission from the NCAA, and special accommodations were made. Both teams would be headquartered in Orlando for the week, and spend most of their time there, including practices, and would be bused up to Gainesville.

Despite the home-field advantage, in the game nicknamed the "Transplant Bowl", Miami, who found the cold much more to its liking, defeated the Gators, 16–7. One of the players on the victorious Redskins squad was future Gators coach Ron Zook.

The one-time moving of the game, and the fears of a permanent relocation, rejuvenated the stalled stadium renovations in Orlando. The game returned to Orlando for 1974, and within a couple of years, the expansion project was complete.

Mascot Challenge
The "Capital One Mascot Challenge" (formerly known as the "Capital One National Mascot of the Year") was a contest where fans voted for their favorite college mascot. The contest began in 2002 with the winner being named during the halftime; the winning school was awarded $20,000 towards their mascot program. With the ending of Capital One's sponsorship of the Citrus Bowl, the challenge was moved in 2014 to the Orange Bowl with Capital One's sponsorship of that game. The 2014 season was also the last time that the contest was held.

Game results

Rankings are based on the AP Poll prior to the game being played. Italics denote a tie game.

Source:

MVPs
Multiple players were recognized in some games – detail, where known, is denoted with B (outstanding back), L (outstanding lineman), O (outstanding offensive player), D (outstanding defensive player), or M (overall MVP) per contemporary newspaper reports.

Three players have been recognized in multiple games; Chuck Ealey of Toledo (1969, 1970, 1971), Brad Cousino of Miami (OH) (1973, 1974), and Anthony Thomas of Michigan (1999, 2001).

Most appearances
Note: this section reflects games played since 1968, when the bowl started hosting major college teams.

Updated through the January 2023 edition (55 games, 110 total appearances).

Teams with multiple appearances

Teams with a single appearance
Won (6): California, Georgia Tech, Illinois, NC State, Notre Dame, Tampa

Lost (15): Boston College, Davidson, Kent State, Louisville, Minnesota, Ohio, Oklahoma, Oklahoma State, Pittsburgh, Southern Miss, Texas Tech, USC, Virginia, Wake Forest, William & Mary

Appearances by conference
Note: this table reflects games played since 1968, when the bowl started hosting major college teams.

Updated through the January 2023 edition (55 games, 110 total appearances).

 Games marked with an asterisk (*) were played in January of the following calendar year.
 Records are based on a team's conference affiliation at the time the game was played; for example, Penn State has appeared both as a Big Ten team and as an Independent team.
 Conferences that are defunct or not currently active in FBS are marked in italics.
 Independent appearances: Boston College (1982), Florida State (1977, 1984), Notre Dame (2017*), Penn State (1987*), Pittsburgh (1978), South Carolina (1975), Southern Miss (1981), and Tampa (1972).

Game records

Source:

Media coverage

The bowl has been broadcast by Mizlou (1976–1983), NBC (1984–1985), and ABC since then, with the exception of ESPN for the 2011 and 2012 editions. Broadcast information for earlier editions of the bowl is lacking.

References

Additional sources
 Orlando Sentinel-Star (November 20, 1973); Various articles- Accessed via microfilm 01-03-2007.

External links
 
 Official website of the Capital One Bowl All American Halftime Show

College football bowls
Recurring sporting events established in 1947
American football in Orlando, Florida
1947 establishments in Florida
New Year's Day